Mardyke may refer to:

 Mardyke, a district of Cork, Ireland containing:
 Mardyke (UCC), a sports venue associated with University College Cork (UCC)
 Mardyke (cricket ground), home ground of Cork County Cricket Club
 Mardyke (river), a tributary of the River Thames. 
 Mardyke Estate, a housing development in east London.

See also

 Mardyck near Dunkirk in France, also spelt Mardijk and Mardyke  
 Fort Mardyke between Mardyck and Dunkirk, English from 1657 to 1662